Raymond E. Wilt, Sr. (December 5, 1907 – April 24, 1978) was a Republican member of the Pennsylvania House of Representatives.

References

Republican Party members of the Pennsylvania House of Representatives
1907 births
1978 deaths
20th-century American politicians